The 1976 United States Senate election in Texas was held on November 2, 1976. Incumbent Democratic U.S. Senator Lloyd Bentsen won re-election to a second term.

Democratic primary

Candidates
Lloyd Bentsen, incumbent U.S. Senator
Leon Dugi
Phil Gramm, Texas A&M economics professor
Hugh Wilson

Results

Republican primary

Candidates 
Alan Steelman, U.S. Representative from Texas's 5th district since 1973

General election

Results

See also 
 1976 United States Senate elections

References

Texas
1976
1976 Texas elections